The Buffalo Volunteer Rifles (BVR) (formerly the Kaffrarian Rifles) is an infantry regiment of the South African Army. As a reserve unit, it has a status roughly equivalent to that of a British Army Reserve or United States Army National Guard unit.

History

Origin
This unit was formed in East London in 1876, as the Buffalo Corps of Rifle Volunteers, for service in the 9th Frontier War.  It disbanded in 1879.  (East London is situated on the Buffalo River, hence the name).

Reformed
The unit was re-formed in July 1883 and was named after the region of Kaffraria, the 19th-century name for the region around East London. There had previously been many other units from this region, from which the Regiment can also claim descent: 
Kaffrarian Volunteer Corps,
Kaffrarian Mounted Rifles (Kaffrarian Rangers), 
Buffalo Volunteer Rifles Corps, 
Buffalo Volunteer Engineers, 
Kaffrarian Volunteer Artillery Corps, 
Berlin Mounted Volunteers, 
Cape Mounted Yeomanry (1st Regiment), 
 Frontier Mounted Riflemen (Brabant's Horse), 
East London Volunteers (Von Linsignen's Buffalo Corps and later Walkers Horse).

On 1 December 1900 George Herbert Farrar was appointed as a Major in the Kaffrarian Rifles.

Under the Union Defence Force
By 1913 the unit was embodied in the Citizen Force as the 5th Infantry (Kaffrarian Rifles), but regained its old name in 1932. In March 1947 the regiment was formally inspected by King George VI on a visit to East London and a photo is available  The unit was temporarily amalgamated with the First City Regiment, as the First City/The Kaffrarian Rifles from 1954 to 1956.

Conflicts
This Regiment and its predecessors took part in all of South Africa's armed conflicts, including:
 Bechuanaland Campaign (1897), 
 Second Boer War, 
 World War I (when it fought in the then German South-West Africa and most of its members went on to serve in East Africa and Europe),
 World War II (when it fought in the Western Desert during 1941 - 1943) as well as in
 South Africa's "Border War" during 1975 to 1986 (when it fought in South-West Africa, Angola and Zambia).

Under the SANDF post 1994 and Peacekeeping

In order to keep pace with the changing political climate in South Africa, the regiment was renamed the Buffalo Volunteer Rifles in 1999, a revised form of the regiment's name when it was raised. It is thus defacto and dejure the successor to the reserve SAA formations of the Eastern Cape.

As of 2014 this regiment is considered to be a "fully integrated and representative" army unit. Members have been attached to the United Nations Operation in Burundi and 
recently a Rifle company returned from the Democratic Republic of the Congo after a six-month spell of active duty as part of MONUSCO.

Leadership

Regimental symbols
 Current regimental colour (since 2001): a dark green background with embroidered in the centre a wreath of ten proteas and two king proteas. Beneath the wreath and above the ribbon is an aloe with five blooms. This symbolises the BVR link with the Border region, the fact that some of its members are Xhosas from the greater Eastern Cape, and its status of the 5th Infantry Regiment from 1913 to 1933. Within the wreath is the regiment's Maltese cross (symbolic of the regiment's King's Royal Rifle Corps and German affiliations, as many of the Regiment's 19th century members were of German extraction) with a buffalo head in the centre, surrounded by two concentric circles. Between the circles the regimental motto,  (meaning "Now with courage" or "Now without fear") is inscribed. At the top of the regimental crest is a powder horn, symbolizing the link with the British Royal Green Jackets regiment. 
 East London bestowed the freedom of the city on the regiment on 25 May 1957.

Previous Dress Insignia

Current Dress Insignia

The Buffalo Volunteer Rifles still utilize a British Infantry tradition where officers had a red backing and ranks were blackened out on fatigues.

Alliances
 - The Rifles

Battle honours
Gaika-Gcaleka 1877, Bechuanaland 1897, South Africa 18991902, South-West Africa 19141915, Western Desert 19411943, Bardia, South-West Africa/Zambia 1979, South-West Africa/Angola 19751976, South-West Africa/Angola 19761989

The regiment claims four more battle honours, which have not been acknowledged:
Transkei 1879, Transkei 18801881, Basutoland 18801881, Wepener

Notes

References

External links 
The Buffalo Volunteer Rifles

Infantry regiments of South Africa
Military units and formations established in 1876
Military units and formations of South Africa in the Border War
Military units and formations of the Second Boer War
Military units and formations of South Africa in World War I
1876 establishments in the Cape Colony